Sparanise is a comune (municipality) in the Province of Caserta in the Italian region Campania, located about  northwest of Naples and about  northwest of Caserta. Its surrounding communities are 
the villages of Francolise, Calvi Risorta, and Pignataro Maggiore.

References

Cities and towns in Campania